Dudhpokhari (दूधपोखरी) is a former village development committee in Lamjung District in the Gandaki Zone of northern-central Nepal. The name Dudhpokhari is derived from the lake which lies in the base of Himalchuli. At the time of the 2011 Nepal census it had a population of 4167 people living in 505 individual households. The highest elevation is Mount Himalchuli. Dudhpokhari kunda, which lies in the base of himalchuli, is a popular religious destination which attracts thousand of Hindus in Shrawan during Janai Purnima.

2015 Nepal earthquake

The village was affected by the earthquake on 25 April 2015, along with Ilampokhari, Gaudu, Kolki and Pyarjung in the Lamjung district.

Mount Himalchuli
Himalchuli, which lies in the Dudhpokhari village development committee is the second highest mountain in the Mansiri Himal, part of the Nepalese Himalayas. It lies south of Manaslu, one of the eight-thousanders. Himalchuli has three main peaks: East (7893 m), West (7540 m) and North (7371 m). It is also often written as two words, "Himal Chuli".

Himalchuli is the 18th highest mountain in the world (using a cutoff of 500m prominence, or re-ascent). It is also notable for its large vertical relief over local terrain. For example, it rises 7000m over the Marshyangdi River to the southwest in about  horizontal distance

References

External links
UN map of the municipalities of Lamjung District

Populated places in Lamjung District